Joseph Turkel (July 15, 1927 – June 27, 2022) was an American character actor who starred in film and television during the Golden Age Era in the 1950s and 1960s. He is known for his roles in Stanley Kubrick's films The Killing, Paths of Glory, and The Shining, and as Dr. Eldon Tyrell in Blade Runner. He also had roles in three of Bert I. Gordon's films.

Early life
Turkel was born in Brooklyn on July 15, 1927, to Benjamin Turkel, who was a tailor, and Gazella (née Goldfisher), a homemaker and occasional opera singer. His parents were Polish Jewish immigrants. He had two brothers, Harold and David.  Turkel joined the United States Army when he was seventeen and served in the European Theater of Operations during World War II.

Career
Turkel's first film appearance was 1948's City Across the River.  His other film appearances include Bert I. Gordon's The Boy and the Pirates as Abu the Genie, Tormented as Nick (both 1960), and Village of the Giants (1965) as the sheriff; as a gangster-sidekick in The Purple Gang (1959); a prisoner of war named "Dino" in the 1965 POW movie King Rat; The Sand Pebbles (1966) as Bronson; The St. Valentine's Day Massacre (1967) as Chicago gangster Jake "Greasy Thumb" Guzik; and the 1990 horror feature The Dark Side of the Moon.

Turkel appeared on the television series The Life and Legend of Wyatt Earp as Jim Rellance on November 13, 1956.  His other television appearances include Sky King (in the 1957 episode "Mystery Horse"), Frontier Doctor, Bat Masterson, U.S. Marshal, The Asphalt Jungle, Mackenzie's Raiders, Kojak, Tales from the Darkside, and Miami Vice (in the episode "Indian Wars").  He also appeared on Bonanza three times, including the 1961 episode "The Many Faces of Gideon Flinch", playing one of two of Bullet Head Burke's right-hand men.

Turkel's best known roles are Lloyd, the ghostly bartender in Stanley Kubrick's The Shining (1980) and Dr. Eldon Tyrell, the android manufacturer in Ridley Scott's Blade Runner (1982).  He was one of only two actors (the other being Philip Stone) to have worked with Kubrick as a credited character three times. The other appearances were in The Killing (1956, as Tiny), and in Paths of Glory (1957, as Private Arnaud),
He retired from acting after reprising his role of Eldon Tyrell in the 1997 Blade Runner video game.  As of 1999, he lived in Southern California and wrote screenplays.  He said in a 2014 interview that Paths of Glory was his favorite among his films.  Prior to his death, Turkel wrote a memoir, The Misery of Success, scheduled for a now posthumous 2022 release.

Personal life
Turkel was married to Anita Josephine Cacciatore, with whom he had two sons. When he attended a 2011 rally in Occupy Seattle, he referred to himself as a "liberal progressive Democrat".

On June 27, 2022, Turkel died at the age of 94 from liver failure at Saint John's Health Center in Santa Monica, California.

Filmography

 City Across the River (1949) – Shimmy Stockton
 Johnny Stool Pigeon (1949) – Bellboy (uncredited)
 Sword in the Desert (1949) – Haganah Soldier (uncredited)
 Angels in Disguise (1949) – Johnny Mutton
 Lucky Losers (1950) – Johnny Angelo
 Federal Man (1950) – Jack "Sneeze" Norton
 Triple Trouble (1950) – Benny the Blood
 Southside 1-1000 (1950) – Frankie
 Halls of Montezuma (1951) – Marine (uncredited)
 Fixed Bayonets! (1951) – Soldier (uncredited)
 Starlift (1951) – Litter Case (uncredited)
 Down Among the Sheltering Palms (1952) – Pvt. Harris (uncredited)
 The Glass Wall (1953) – Freddie Zakoyla
 A Slight Case of Larceny (1953) – Holdup Man (uncredited)
 Man Crazy (1953) – Ray
 Duffy of San Quentin (1954) – Frank Roberts
 Gypsy Colt (1954) – Chuck (uncredited)
 Return from the Sea (1954) – Sailor (uncredited)
 The Human Jungle (1954) – Delinquent Hood (uncredited)
 The Bamboo Prison (1954) – P.O.W. (uncredited)
 Cell 2455, Death Row (1955) – Curly (uncredited)
 Mad at the World (1955) – Pete Johnson
 The Naked Street (1955) – Shimmy
 Lucy Gallant (1955) – One of Casey's Air Force Buddies (uncredited)
 Inside Detroit (1956) – Pete Link
 The Killing (1956) – Tiny
 The Proud and Profane (1956) – Patient with Cards (uncredited)
 Friendly Persuasion (1956) – Poor Loser (uncredited)
 The Shadow on the Window (1957) – Lounger (uncredited)
 Hellcats of the Navy (1957) – Chick
 Beau James (1957) – Reporter (uncredited)
 The Midnight Story (1957) – Lothario at Dance (uncredited)
 Jeanne Eagels (1957) – Eddie, Reporter (uncredited)
 House of Numbers (1957) – Bradville – Convict (uncredited)
 Paths of Glory (1957) – Private Pierre Arnaud
 The Beast of Budapest (1958) – Martin
 The Bonnie Parker Story (1958) – Chuck Darrow
 The Case Against Brooklyn (1958) – Henchman Monte
 Verboten! (1959) – Infantryman
 Warlock (1959) – Chet Haggin (uncredited)
 Here Come the Jets (1959) – Henley
 The Purple Gang (1959) – Eddie Olsen
 Visit to a Small Planet (1960) – Malcolm (uncredited)
 The Boy and the Pirates (1960) – Abu the Genie
 Tormented (1960) – Nick, The Blackmailer
 Bat Masterson (1960) – Fargo
 Portrait of a Mobster (1961) – Joe Noe
 The Yellow Canary (1963) – Policeman

 The Carpetbaggers (1964) – Reporter (uncredited)
 Combat! (1964) – Pvt. Klimmer
 Village of the Giants (1965) – Sheriff
 King Rat (1965) – Dino
 The Sand Pebbles (1966) – Seaman Bronson
 The St. Valentine's Day Massacre (1967) – Jake "Greasy Thumb" Guzik
 The Rat Patrol (1967) – Capt. Bruener
 The Devil's 8 (1969) – Sam

 Five Savage Men (1970) – Peyote
 Wild in the Sky (1972) – Corazza
 Six Hundred and Sixty–Six (1972) – Col. Ferguson
 Cycle Psycho (1973) – Harry
 The Prisoner of Second Avenue (1975) – Man Upstairs (uncredited)
 The Hindenburg (1975) – Detective Moore
 The Commitment (1976) – Jules
 Which Way Is Up? (1977) – Harry Boatwright
 The Shining (1980) – Lloyd the bartender
 Blade Runner (1982) – Dr. Eldon Tyrell
 The Dark Side of the Moon (1990) – Paxton Warner
 Blade Runner (1997) – Dr. Eldon Tyrell (voice, final role)

References
Specific

Bibliography

Further reading
 Boucher, Geoff; Crabtree, Sheigh (July 31, 2007). "An Actor's Lessons in Storytelling". Los Angeles Times. p. E5

External links

 

1927 births
2022 deaths
Male actors from New York City
California Democrats
American male film actors
American male television actors
American people of Polish-Jewish descent
Jewish American male actors
People from Brooklyn
United States Army personnel of World War II
People from Los Angeles
20th-century American male actors
New York (state) Democrats
American Ashkenazi Jews
21st-century American Jews
Deaths from liver failure